Cognitive, Affective, & Behavioral Neuroscience is peer-reviewed scientific journal covering research on behavior and brain processes in humans. It was established in 1973 as Psychobiology and received its current title in 2001, with volume numbering restarting at 1. The journal is published by Springer Science+Business Media on behalf of the Psychonomic Society and the editor-in-chief is Diego A. Pizzagalli (Harvard Medical School).

Abstracting and indexing 
The journal is abstracted and indexed in:

According to the Journal Citation Reports, the journal has a 2020 impact factor of 3.282.

References

External links 
 

Publications established in 1973
Springer Science+Business Media academic journals
Quarterly journals
English-language journals
Neuroscience journals
Cognitive science journals